Prorella albida is a moth in the family Geometridae first described by Samuel E. Cassino and Louis W. Swett in 1923. It is found in the US states of California, Utah, New Mexico, Colorado and south-western Texas.

The wingspan is about 14 mm. The wings are pale creamy with light brown crosslines and costal spotting. Adults have been recorded on wing in July, September and November.

References

Eupitheciini
Moths of North America
Fauna of the California chaparral and woodlands
Fauna of the Sierra Nevada (United States)
Moths described in 1923